On June 4, 2020, Chantel Moore, an Indigenous Canadian woman, was shot and killed by Constable Jeremy Son of the Edmundston, New Brunswick police, who were called to perform a wellness check on her. Moore's death drew national attention and outrage. However, the New Brunswick’s public prosecution service said it found Son's actions were "reasonable under the circumstances" and he was not charged with any crime.

Background 
Moore was a member of the Tla-o-qui-aht First Nation and had recently moved to New Brunswick to be closer to her six-year-old daughter, who was living with Moore’s mother. The wellness check was asked for by Moore's boyfriend in Toronto, who was worried Moore was being harassed.

Incident 
Moore opened the door to her residence holding a knife and walked towards the responding officer. When commands in French to drop the knife were not followed, he fired four times, killing Moore. He was not equipped with a Taser.

Public response 
In response to the incident, attention was raised to the fact that Edmundston police officers do not wear body cameras; this is not unusual for police services in Canada due to the cost of the devices and questions over their effectiveness. Moore's family questioned the decision of the Edmundston officer to not attempt using non-lethal force in the interaction, considering the shooting to have been excessive given the small stature of Moore and the fact that she was only armed with a knife. Indigenous Services Minister Marc Miller commented "I don't understand how someone dies during a wellness check."

Investigation 
As New Brunswick does not have its own police investigation service, Quebec's Bureau of Independent Investigations investigated the killing. This decision drew calls from Indigenous leaders for an independent public investigation into her death. Investigators concluded the report in December 2020, referring it to New Brunswick's public prosecution service to determine if charges should be laid. After reviewing the report and available evidence, the prosecution service determined that the officer's actions were "reasonable under the circumstances," finding that he was confined to a third-floor balcony and that she posed a "potential lethal threat approaching him quickly." The Canadian criminal code allows police officers to defend themselves and others with lethal force under certain circumstances. The independent report corroborated initial police allegations that Moore did not follow commands to drop the knife. Witnesses heard the commands. The officer, a use of force instructor for the department, was not equipped with a taser.

A coroner's inquest made 20 recommendations for ways that law enforcement can better respond to police interventions. The Edmundston police department at the time of the incident only had one functioning taser; their total was later increased to 4 and officers were "trained and equipped with pepper spray and a telescopic baton, as less lethal tools."

Aftermath 
Occurring just over a week after the death of Regis Korchinski-Paquet, an Indigenous-black woman, the shooting of Moore caused scrutiny to be raised over Canadian police's capability to de-escalate situations involving mental health crisis. Indigenous leaders, Moore's grandmother, and Minister Miller linked the killing to systemic racism of Indigenous people by Canadian police.  Though Indigenous peoples make up 5 percent of Canada’s population, 36 percent of people shot to death by RCMP officers over a 10-year period were Indigenous. In the aftermath of the killing, the chiefs of a coalition of Maliseet First Nations called for an independent probe of the New Brunswick justice system to address systemic discrimination against Indigenous people. Rallies, protests, and healing walks were held across Canada to call for justice for Moore. Eight days after the shooting of Moore, a second Indigenous person, Rodney Levi, was killed by police in New Brunswick. Both deaths led to Premier Blaine Higgs deciding not to proceed with proposed legislation to increase the emergency powers of the police. The investigation's findings were called a "stinging blow" by British Columbia's First Nations Leadership Council. Moore's family filed a lawsuit the following year alleging that the city provided inadequate training to law enforcement involved in wellness checks and accusing Son of negligence. The city and Son deny the allegations; the claims brought by Moore's family have not yet been tested in court.

In 2023, New Brunswick reached an agreement with Nova Scotia to allow that province's Serious Incident Response Team to open an office in New Brunswick to act as a local police watchdog for incidents in the province.

References 

Law enforcement controversies
2020 in New Brunswick
People shot dead by law enforcement officers in Canada
First Nations history in New Brunswick
2020 crimes in Canada
June 2020 events in Canada